Rosswood is a settlement in British Columbia.

Climate

References

Settlements in British Columbia